Tamtoraq (also Romanized as Tamţorāq; also known as Tamtorāb-e Qarānqū and Tamţorābī) is a village in Qaranqu Rural District, in the Central District of Hashtrud County, East Azerbaijan Province, Iran. At the 2006 census, its population was 120, in 21 families.

References 

Towns and villages in Hashtrud County